The 1980–81 season was FC Dinamo București's 32nd season in Divizia A. The season brought a new manager for Dinamo, Valentin Stănescu replacing Angelo Niculescu. In the championship, Dinamo finished second, three points behind the champions Universitatea Craiova. In the Romanian Cup, Dinamo was again eliminated in the last 32 phase, this time by Corvinul Hunedoara.

Results

References 
 www.labtof.ro
 www.romaniansoccer.ro

1980
Association football clubs 1980–81 season
Romanian football clubs 1980–81 season